Le Grand-Village-Plage is a commune in the Charente-Maritime department in southwestern France. It is situated on the Île-d'Oléron.

Population

See also
 Communes of the Charente-Maritime department

References

External links
 

Communes of Charente-Maritime
Oléron
Populated coastal places in France